Agdistis protecta is a moth in the family Pterophoridae. It is known from Turkmenistan and Iran.

The wingspan is 15–17 mm.

References

Agdistinae
Moths described in 1999